Laetisaria is a genus of fungi in the family Corticiaceae. Basidiocarps (fruit bodies) are effused, corticioid, smooth, and grow as plant pathogens on grasses or agave leaves, or as lichenicolous fungi on lichens, or on dead wood. Laetisaria fuciformis is of economic importance as the cause of "red thread disease" in turfgrass.

References

Corticiales
Agaricomycetes genera